Julia japonica is a species of a sea snail with a shell comprising two separate hinged pieces or valves. It is a marine gastropod mollusk in the family Juliidae.

Distribution
The type locality for this species is Wakayama, Honshū, Japan.

Ecology
It eats green alga Microdictyon japonicum.

Its shell was also found in the intestine of fish Pacific yellowtail emperor (Lethrinus atkinsoni).

References

Juliidae
Molluscs of Japan
Gastropods described in 1951